The 2011–12 Euro Hockey League was the fifth season of the Euro Hockey League, Europe's premier club field hockey tournament organized by the EHF. It was held at four different locations from October 2011 to May 2012.

The final was played between Hamburg and Amsterdam at the Wagener Stadium in Amstelveen, Netherlands. Hamburg defeated Amsterdam 2–1 on penalty strokes (2–2 after extra time) to win a record third title. HGC were the defending champions, but they did not qualify for this season's edition.

Association team allocation

A total of 24 teams from 12 of the 45 EHF member associations participated in the 2011–12 Euro Hockey League. The association ranking based on the EHL country coefficients is used to determine the number of participating teams for each association:
 Associations 1–4 each have three teams qualify.
 Associations 5–8 each have two teams qualify.
 Associations 9–12 each have one team qualify.

Teams

Round One
The 24 teams were drawn into eight pools of three. In each pool, teams played against each other once in a round-robin format. The pool winners and runners-up advanced to the round of 16. Pools A, D, E, and F were played in Brasschaat, Belgium from 21 to 23 October 2011 and the other pools were played in Mülheim, Germany. If a game was won, the winning team received 5 points. A draw resulted in both teams receiving 2 points. A loss gave the losing team 1 point unless the losing team lost by 3 or more goals, then they received 0 points.

Pool A

Pool B

Pool C

Pool D

Pool E

Pool F

Pool G

Pool H

Knockout stage
The round of 16 and the quarter-finals were played in Rotterdam, Netherlands from 6 to 9 April 2012 and the semi-finals, bronze medal match and the final were played in Amstelveen, Netherlands from 26 to 27 May 2012. If the score remained tied, the match went to extra time with the silver goal rule being enforced. Matches that remained tied at the end of extra time were settled by a penalty shoot-out.

Bracket

Round of 16

Quarter-finals

Semi-finals

Bronze medal match

Final

External links
 Official Website (English)

Euro Hockey League
2011–12 in European field hockey
October 2011 sports events in Europe
April 2012 sports events in Europe
May 2012 sports events in Europe